{{automatic taxobox
| name = Desmatophocidae
| image              = Skeleton of Allodesmus.jpg
| image_caption      = Skeleton of Allodesmus sp. at the National Museum of Nature and Science, Tokyo, Japan
|image2 = Atopotarus courseni LACM 1376.jpg
|image2_caption = Holotype skeleton of Atopotarus courseni at the Natural History Museum of Los Angeles County
| fossil_range = Early to Late Miocene
| taxon = Desmatophocidae
| subdivision_ranks = Genera
| subdivision = 
Allodesmus
Atopotarus DesmatophocaEodesmus}}

Desmatophocidae is an extinct family of pinnipeds closely related to the eared seals and walruses.

Genera
 Allodesmus Atopotarus Desmatophoca Eodesmus''

References 

Prehistoric pinnipeds
Miocene first appearances
Miocene extinctions
Prehistoric mammal families